Benny Kejansi (born December 16, 1973) is a retired Surinamese footballer who played as a forward for Inter Moengotapoe in the Hoofdklasse, and for the Suriname national team.

Club career 
Kejansi began his career in the SVB Hoofdklasse. He played for Inter Moengotapoe in Moengo finishing his second season as the league's joint top goalscorer together with Ifenildo Vlijter (of House of Billiards) finishing with 24 goals each.

International career 
Kejansi has played for the Suriname national team having made his debut on 31 March 1996 in a 1–0 loss to Jamaica. he has made 13 official appearances in qualifying campaigns for the FIFA World Cup, CONCACAF Gold Cup and the Caribbean Cup.

Career statistics

International performance
Statistics accurate as of matches played on 11 August 2002,

International goals
Scores and results list Suriname' goal tally first.

Honors

Club
Inter Moengotapoe
 SVB Hoofdklasse (2): 2006–07, 2007–08
 Suriname President's Cup (1): 2007

Individual
 SVB Hoofdklasse Top Goalscorer (1): 1999–2000 (joint)

References

External links 
 

Living people
1973 births
Surinamese footballers
Suriname international footballers
SVB Eerste Divisie players
Inter Moengotapoe players
Association football forwards